Cando School District was a school district headquartered in Cando, North Dakota.

History
Circa 1970 the Cando School District switched from coal heating to electric heating. In 1980 the district was considering reverting to coal heating. This was due to an increase in the money it had to spend on energy bills.

In 2008 the Bisbee-Egeland School District and the Cando School District were dissolved and merged into the current North Star School District. The Bisbee-Engeland School immediately closed with all students sent to Cando. In Cando, the vote succeeded with 351 approving and 10 disapproving. In October 2007 people in the Bisbee-Egeland district voted to consolidate with 189 for and 16 against.

References

External links
 
Former school districts in North Dakota
Towner County, North Dakota
2008 disestablishments in North Dakota
School districts disestablished in 2008